The New Believers: A Survey of Sects, 'Cults', and Alternative Religions, is a book by David V. Barrett covering the origin, history, beliefs, practices and controversies of more than sixty new religious movements, including The Family International (previously known as the Children of God), International Church of Christ, Osho (Rajneesh), Satanism, New Kadampa Tradition, Wicca, Druidry, chaos magic, Scientology, and others.

In The Daily Telegraph reviewer Demian Thompson wrote:

David V. Barrett in the Skeptical Inquirer wrote:

Patrick Curry in The Independent wrote:

References 

Religious studies books
Books about cults
2001 non-fiction books
Occult books
Books critical of Scientology
2001 in religion
Cassell (publisher) books